Aqeel Ahmed (born 14 July 1987), also known by his birthname Mohammed Aqeel Ahmed or M Aqeel Ahmed, is a  British film writer and director, as well as founder of his own creative, film & video production company, Ahmco. He is known for his comic short films and animations, usually highlighting social problems and situations. His student short film, Alienated (2008), a visual-effects film about an alien trying to be accepted on Earth, was shortlisted for the Virgin Media Shorts Festival 2008, and is up for awards.

Filmography
How to be a Superhero (2007), Director
Alienated (2008), Director
Shattered Pieces  (2009), Director

Shattered Pieces
In 2009, Ahmed completed a 15-minute short film entitled Shattered Pieces, about a man waking up to find London destroyed. It was shown in film festivals domestically as well as internationally. 
In 2010, he uploaded a remastered version of the film (with new colour grading and visual effects) to the popular video sharing site, YouTube

Ahmco and upcoming projects
In September 2011, Ahmed announced on Twitter that he was planning to set up a new production company called Ahmco. Later, a Twitter account and Facebook page emerged, revealing that the company will offer creative services with, the not surprising, speciality in film and video. Ahmco will also serve as a film production company, producing Ahmed's future film projects. The first announced "in-house" production is currently titled AndiRoid.

References

External links
 

English screenwriters
English male screenwriters
English film directors
English film producers
1987 births
Living people